The Templo de la Sagrada Familia (Temple of the Holy Family) also called Templo de Jesús, María y José, is a Renaissance church located in the city of Cusco, Cusco Region, Peru. This building was designed by Francisco Becerra.

History
On September 13, 1723, the first stone was placed to begin the construction of the Templo de la Sagrada Familia by order of Bishop Gabriel de Arregui following the design of Francisco Becerra. After the death of the architect in charge of the work, it was re-started in 1733 and was completed on September 3, 1735.

In 1996, with the support of the Archbishopric of Cusco and the European Union, the temple was restored after it was closed about 30 years.

Description
The temple is composed of a Latin cross nave with a rectangular floor plan with small lateral niches. The walls inside the temple are polished stone with lime plaster. The whole church is also built with andesite. The roof of the temple is composed of five vaults built with rectangular bricks. In the sector of the presbytery the altarpiece or baroque altar with two lateral sacristies is located. The wall of the facade is treated as a rectangular stonework canvas, composed of three bodies. The crowning of the facade is a cenefa element with circular ornaments on which the cornice tops.

The temple has a altarpiece of cedar, made in 1737, baroque, carved and gilded, with mostly old images and canvases and a beautiful silver front, as well as the tabernacle and the racks, all very well made. It is recorded that in 1745, José Pardo de Figueroa, Marquis of San Lorenzo de Valleumbroso, donated the front of silver, mayas, blandones and other wealths, as well as a silver lamp and a crystal lamp.

The interior paintings are by the noble Indigenous Antonio Sinchi Roca. The paintings are titled The Eucharist, The Penance and The Baptism, which possibly formed part of a series dedicated to the Sacraments. In another place, the portrait of Bishop Gabriel de Arregui was painted, the person who began the construction of the temple.

See also
List of buildings and structures in Cusco

References

1723 establishments in the Spanish Empire
Roman Catholic churches completed in 1735
Roman Catholic churches in Cusco
Renaissance architecture in Peru
18th-century Roman Catholic church buildings in Peru